Edgbarrow Woods is a   Local Nature Reserve on the northern outskirts of Sandhurst in Berkshire. It is owned and managed by Wellington College.

Geography and site

This site contains many habitats, including semi-natural high forest, wet and dry heathland and acidic, unimproved, lowland grassland.

History

The area has royal associations, being a former royal hunting ground created in the 11th century by William the Conqueror.

In 2002 the site was declared as a local nature reserve by Bracknell Forest Borough Council.

Fauna

The site has the following fauna:

Mammals

Common noctule

Invertebrates

Silver-studded blue

Birds

Eurasian bullfinch
Eurasian hobby
Dartford warbler

Flora

The site has the following special flora amongst others:

Succisa pratensis or devil's-bit scabious
Drosera rotundifolia or common sundew

References

Parks and open spaces in Berkshire
Nature reserves in Berkshire
Local Nature Reserves in Berkshire